The Quartettsatz in c-Moll (English: Quartet Movement in C minor), D. 103 was composed by Franz Schubert in 1814. It is believed to be the only surviving movement of a complete quartet in C minor.

Background
The movement is believed to be one of several quartets sold to Anton Diabelli by Ferdinand Schubert following his brother's death in 1828. Remaining unpublished, the surviving manuscript comprising an incomplete movement that ends at the recapitulation came into the possession of the Gesellschaft der Musikfreunde during the latter half of the 19th century. Musicologist Alfred Orel prepared a performing version that was published in 1939.

Structure
The composition as completed for performance consists of a single movement marked Grave - Allegro and lasts around 8 minutes.

References
Notes

Sources
 Aderhold, Werner (editor). New Schubert Edition, Series VI, Volume 4: String Quartets II. Bärenreiter, 1994.

 Deutsch, Otto Erich (and others). Schubert Thematic Catalogue (several editions), No. 103.

String quartets by Franz Schubert
1814 compositions
Schubert
Compositions by Franz Schubert published posthumously
Schubert
Musical compositions completed by others